Final Draft is screenwriting software for writing and formatting screenplays.

History 
Final Draft was co-founded in 1990 by Marc Madnick and Ben Cahan.

In 2013, Final Draft was awarded a Primetime Emmy Engineering Award.

In 2016, Final Draft was acquired by Cast & Crew Entertainment Services.

Usage 
The program is a screenwriting software for writing and formatting a screenplay to meet submission standards set by theater, television and film industries. The program can also be used to write documents such as stageplays, outlines, treatments, query letters, novels, graphic novels, manuscripts, and basic text documents.

Final Draft's main competitors are Movie Magic Screenwriter, Celtx, Fade In, and WriterDuet.

References

External links
 

MacOS text-related software
Screenwriting software
Windows text-related software
1991 software